Kamdem Toham's gecko (Hemidactylus kamdemtohami) is a species of gecko, a lizard in the family Gekkonidae. The species is endemic to western Central Africa.

Etymology
The specific name, kamdemtohami, is in honor of Cameroonese zoologist André Kamdem Toham.

Geographic range
H. kamdemtohami is found in Gabon, Equatorial Guinea, and Cameroon.

Reproduction
H. kamdemtohami is oviparous.

References

Further reading
Bauer AM, Pauwels OSG (2002). "A new forest-dwelling Hemidactylus (Squamata: Gekkonidae) from Gabon, West Africa". African Journal of Herpetology 51 (1): 1–8. (Hemidactylus kamdemtohami, new species).
Chirio, Laurent; LeBreton, Matthew (2007). Atlas des reptiles du Cameroun. Paris: Muséum nationale d'histoire naturelle. 688 pp. . (in French).
Rösler, Herbert (2015). "Bemerkungen über einege Geckos der Zoologischen Staatssammlung Müchen ". Gekkota, Suppl. (2): 3-54. (in German).

Hemidactylus
Geckos of Africa
Reptiles described in 2002
Reptiles of Cameroon
Reptiles of Equatorial Guinea
Reptiles of Gabon
Taxa named by Aaron M. Bauer
Taxa named by Olivier Sylvain Gérard Pauwels